Paramischocyttarus is a small afrotropical and palearctic Zethus-like genus of potter wasps.

Species
The following species are classified as belonging to Paramischocyttarus:

 Paramischocyttarus buyssoni (Gribodo, 1896)
 Paramischocyttarus guichardi Giordani Soika, 1987
 Paramischocyttarus lacuum Stadelmann, 1898
 Paramischocyttarus subtilis Magretti, 1884

References

Biological pest control wasps
Potter wasps